Dato' Seri Amirudin bin Shari (born 8 February 1980) is a Malaysian politician who has served as the 16th Menteri Besar of Selangor since June 2018, Member of Parliament (MP) for Gombak since November 2022 and Member of the Selangor State Legislative Assembly (MLA) for Sungai Tua since May 2018 and for Batu Caves from March 2008 to May 2018. He also served as Member of the Selangor State Executive Council (EXCO) from September 2014 to his promotion to the Menteri Besarship in June 2018. He is a member of the People's Justice Party (PKR), a component party of the state and federal coalition of Pakatan Harapan (PH). He has also served as the Vice-President of PKR since July 2022 and State Chairman of PH of Selangor since March 2020 as well as of Pahang since September 2022. 

He was the manager of the Selangor F.C. football team, leading the team in two consecutive Malaysia Cup finals, in 2015 and 2016. The famous 33rd mission to win Malaysia Cup was accomplished in 2015 under his leadership. Selangor was also the champion of 2016 Sukma under Amirudin.

Amirudin won his first attempt in the electoral campaign in 2008 as a young candidate. He helped the Pakatan Rakyat coalition, consisted of People's Justice Party, Democratic Action Party, and Pan Islamic Party, to defeat Barisan Nasional for the first time in Selangor electoral history. In 2013, he retained the position as a member of the Selangor State Legislative Assembly and became a member of Selangor State Executive Council, holding the portfolio for Youth Development, Sports, Cultural and Entrepreneurship Development.

Due to his active involvement in People's Justice Party Youth's Wing since 2004, he had been chosen as the Vice Chief of the division. On 4 January 2014, Amirudin announced his candidacy for the PKR Youth Chief's post, teaming up with Afif Bahardin in AMK Baru line ups. He lost to Nik Nazmi Nik Ahmad on the most excruciating campaign to date.

Even before being appointed as the member of Selangor State Executive Council, Amirudin was actively involved with policy making, and state programmes for youths and sports. He was unofficially named Vice President of the Selangor State Executive Council along with Yunus Hairi and Jenice Lee. They founded the Penggerak Belia Tempatan (PeBT) (English: Local Youth Movement) initiative together, which engineered many of the youth programmes in Selangor. Amirudin was also appointed as the Vice Chairman of the Selangor Sports Council during Khalid Ibrahim's tenure as Menteri Besar of Selangor, holding the position from 2008 until 2010.

During his early involvement in social activism and politics, Amirudin campaigned on democracy, cultural, and students matters. Frequent sessions of open discussion with Komuniti Seni Jalan Telawi (KSJT) were held, with the goal to promote the arts and culture.

Personal background
He grew up in Pontian, Johor. He received his secondary education at Sekolah Menengah Benut in Pontian and his university education at Universiti Putra Malaysia, graduated with a bachelor's degree in Social Science. He was actively involved in student activism during his campus days and was known as a skilled debater.

After leaving university, Amirudin worked as program coordinator at Institute for Policy Research (Institut Kajian Dasar), a non-governmental organisation dedicated to the cause of cultural revivalism and the construction of civil society.

Throughout his career at the Institute for Policy Research, Amirudin carried out the drafting and supervision of social awareness programs including politics with series under his management such as Public Intellectual Forum, Tanwiri Islam Program and also Sekolah Politik, a program that enlightens politic for youngsters.

Besides, Amirudin acquired special training on electoral preparations titled 'How to Do a Campaign' under Konrad Adenauer Stiftung which was held in Berlin and Munich, Germany. These experiences are vital as Amirudin has always been given tasks on logistics, communications, and mobilisation in his early involvement in Parti Keadilan Rakyat.

In March 2005, Amirudin married Masdiana Muhamad. The couple have six children.

Political career

Youth chief aspirant
Active involvement in Keadilan Youth's Wing, Parti Keadilan Rakyat since 2004 and had been chosen as the Vice Chief of the division. On January 4, 2014, Amirudin announced his candidacy for the Keadilan Youth Chief's post with a team up alongside Yang Berhormat Tuan Dr Afif Bahardin in AMK Baru line ups for the upcoming party polls before losing to Yang Berhormat Tuan Nik Nazmi Nik Ahmad on the most excruciating campaign to date.

In the three-way competition, AMK Baru faction led by Amirudin obviously dominates the party polls with landslide victories in popular states for Keadilan such as Selangor and Sabah while receiving good number of polls in Penang, Kedah, Kelantan, and Perak. However, final results shows that Nik Nazmi who won the post for Chief of Keadilan's Youth Wing in a black history after several branches objected into recounting the ballots resulting Amirudin's victory into losses by previously won ballot boxes.

For the record, the Deputy Chief AMK post, 3 Vice Chiefs AMK, and 16 out of 20 Central AMK Committee Members are won by representatives from AMK Baru.

Member of the Selangor State Assembly 
Amirudin won his first attempt in the electoral campaign in 2008 as a young candidate which helped the Parti Keadilan Rakyat, Democratic Action Party, and Malaysian Islamic Party later formed the Pakatan Rakyat coalition defeated Barisan Nasional for the first time in Selangor electoral history. Amirudin toppled the favourite candidate, T. Mohan from Malaysian Indian Congress (MIC) with a majority of 3,639.

Successfully retained his position after the 13th General Election with a win over his contender, Rawisandran Narayanan in a high voter turnout at 85.7% and Amirudin still manages to keep 55.03% popular votes with a majority of 3,261.

Appointment as Selangor State Executive Councillor 
In September 2014, with the appointment of the new Menteri Besar of Selangor, Azmin Ali, Amirudin was appointed as the State Executive Councillor in charge of Youth Development, Sports, Cultural and 67 Entrepreneurship Development which preceded by Yang Berhormat Dato' Dr Haji Ahmad Yunus Bin Hairi. Even before being appointed as the Selangor State Executive Councillor, Amirudin involves with policies making and state programmes for youths and sports whereas he was accounted as the vice for Selangor State Executive Councillor along with YB Dato' Haji Yunus Hairi and Jenice Lee. They created together the Penggerak Belia Tempatan (PeBT) and became the engineer of many youth programmes today in Selangor. Amirudin was also appointed as the Vice Chairman of Selangor Sports Council during Tan Sri Khalid Ibrahim period.

Youth Development
 
As the appointed youth to represent Generasi Muda, Amirudin continues the efforts to fortify Generasi Muda by launching Ten Fundamentals of Selangor Youth which contains the guidelines and direction of the youth development completely and focusing major fields. Amirudin also continues Youth Marriage Incentives which gives handful incentive towards Selangor's newly-wed couples.

The existence of Youth Development Department under the wing of Selangor Sport Council also embarks organized Generasi Muda programs. Penggerak Belia Tempatan (PeBT) has been updated and recent programs are fresher than ever and involving bigger communities. On the other hand, the programs embarked by Amirudin are becoming trend setter as Selangor International Cybergames being claimed one of the best in this region. E-Sport is one agenda that he lays his eyes upon for building new generation of youth in the interactive world.

Amirudin also launched Selangor Plus Campaign in effort to promote a healthy lifestyle for the youth. As for early initiative, Selangor Plus started from 2015 and persisted until today to fork out the best talent from the youth in futsal, basketball, sepak takraw, and netball.

Menteri Besar of Selangor 
Amirudin was appointed as MB of Selangor following Azmin's appointment as a federal minister. Amirudin's term as MB was marked by several controversies. These included questions raised over a plan to demolish and rebuild the Shah Alam Stadium, the excision and development of the Shah Alam Community Forest and plans to quarry part of the Bukit Lagong forest reserve.

Member of Parliament of Gombak 
In 2022, Amirudin was elected to the federal seat of Gombak.

Election results

Honours

Honours of Malaysia
  :
  Knight Grand Commander of the Order of the Crown of Selangor (SPMS) - Dato' Seri (2019)

References 

Living people
1980 births
People from Johor
Malaysian people of Malay descent
Malaysian Muslims
People's Justice Party (Malaysia) politicians
Members of the Dewan Rakyat
Members of the 15th Malaysian Parliament
Members of the Selangor State Legislative Assembly
Selangor state executive councillors
Chief Ministers of Selangor
University of Putra Malaysia alumni
21st-century Malaysian politicians
Knights Grand Commander of the Order of the Crown of Selangor